Tegeticula carnerosanella is a moth of the family Prodoxidae. It is found from western Texas in the United States south to Mexico. The habitat consists of shrub desert.

The wingspan is 20-27.5 mm. Both the forewings and hindwings are white. The larvae feed on Yucca carnerosana and Yucca faxoniana.

References

Moths described in 1999
Prodoxidae